The Brabant Company (Dutch - Brabantsche Compagnie), also known as the New Company (Nieuwe Compagnie) was a precursor of the Dutch East India Company (VOC).

The Brabantsche Company was set up in 1599, by Jacques de Velaer, Isaac le Maire, Hans Hunger, Marcus de Vogelaer and Gerard Reynst. In 1600, the Brabantsche Company merged with the Compagnie van Verre to form the Vereenigde Compagnie van Amsterdam. Finally this company and other companies in Rotterdam, West Friesland and Zeeland merged into the VOC in 1602.

See also
 European chartered companies founded around the 17th century (in French)

1599 establishments in the Dutch Republic
1602 disestablishments
Companies established in the 16th century
Organizations established in the 1590s
Companies of the Dutch Republic
History of the Dutch East India Company
Trading companies of the Dutch Republic
Trading companies established in the 16th century